The following is a list of notable companies that produce skateboards and skateboarding merchandise.

Companies listed may also be members of the US-based trade association, the International Association of Skateboard Companies and may have skateboarding sponsorship arrangements with individuals, venues or events.

A

 Adidas SB
 Alien Workshop
 Almost Skateboards

B 

 Baker Skateboards
 Billabong
 Birdhouse Skateboards
 Black Box Distribution
 Blind Skateboards
 Blueprint Skateboards
 Bones Bearings

C

 California Free Former
 California Skateparks
 Circa
 Cliché Skateboards
 Chocolate Skateboards

D

 DC Shoes
 Deathwish
 Deluxe Distribution
 DGK Skateboards
 Dunkelvolk
 DVS Shoes
 Dwindle Distribution

E

 Element Skateboards
 Enjoi
 Etnies
 Emerica

F

 Fallen Footwear
 Famous Stars and Straps
 Flip Skateboards

G

 Girl Distribution Company
 Girl Skateboards
 Globe International

H

 Hook-Ups Skateboards
 Hubba Wheels
 Hurley International

I

 Independent Truck Company
 IPath Footwear

K

 KR3W
 Kryptonics

L

 Lifted Research Group

M

 Mambo Graphics

N

 New Era
 NHS, Inc.
 Nike SB
 Nixon Watches
 New Balance Numeric

O

 Obey
 Osiris Shoes

P

 Primitive
 Plan B Skateboards
 Powell Peralta
 Palace Skateboards

Q

 Quiksilver

R

 Rayne Longboards
 Rip Curl
 Royal Trucks
 RVCA
 Rubicon Skateboards

S

 Santa Cruz Skateboards
 Sector 9
 Sessions
 Spohn Ranch
 Stussy
 Supreme
 Shake Junt
 Spitfire Wheels

T

 Tensor Trucks
 Thrasher
 Toy Machine
 The Hundreds
 Tum Yeto
 Two Seasons

V

 Vans
 Vision Street Wear
 Volcom

W

 World Industries

Z

 Zero Skateboards
 Zoo York

References

Skateboarding companies
Skateboarding